Kasur (Urdu and  ; also romanized as Qasūr; from pluralized Arabic word Qasr meaning "palaces" or "forts") is a city to south of Lahore, in the Pakistani province of Punjab. The city serves as the headquarters of Kasur District. Kasur is the 24th largest city of Pakistan by population. It is also known for being the burial place of the 17th-century Sufi-poet Bulleh Shah. It is farther west of the border with neighboring India, and bordered to Lahore, Sheikhupura, and the Okara District of Punjab Province. The city is an aggregation of 26 fortified hamlets overlooking the alluvial valleys of the Beas and Sutlej rivers.

Etymology
Kasur derives its name from the Arabic and Persian word qasur, meaning "palaces," or "forts." Hindu traditions claim that Kasur was founded by, and named for, Prince Kusha of the Ramayana, son of the Hindu deities Rama and Sita. According to that belief, the city was named Kashawar along with its neighbouring city, Lahore which was named Lahawar. Historical records reject an ancient founding of the city and dates it back to 1525, when it was found as a fortified settlement.

History

Early
Kasur region was an agricultural region with forests during the Indus Valley civilization. The Kasur region was ruled variously by the Maurya Empire, Indo-Greek kingdom, Kushan Empire, Gupta Empire, White Huns, Kushano-Hephthalites and Kabul Shahi kingdoms. The region is also said to have been visited by the Chinese pilgrim Xuanzang in 633 AD. Alexander Cunningham writes about his visit describing the place filled with tombs, mosques, and thickly covered with ruins. The city which is most commonly associated with Kasur was described as being situated somewhere on the right bank of the Beas (Sutlej) opposite to the city of Lahore.

Arrival of Islam

Ghaznavids 
In 1005 CE, Sultan Mahmud of Ghazni, took over the region under the Ghaznavid dynasty. This led to the introduction of Islam in the Northern Punjab area, after being conquered. Sufi missionaries were sent to the region in order to preach Islam which made the Punjab region predominantly Muslim. The city was later under the rule of the Delhi Sultanate and the Mughals.

Kheshgi Dynasty 
Kasur was established as a city by the Kheshgi tribe of Pashtuns from Kabul who had migrated to the region in 1525 from Afghanistan during the reign of Babur and built several small forts in the area, establishing the Kheshgi chieftaincy. The city was built as an aggregation of about twelve fortified hamlets, known as kots forming a considerable town. The 12 mahallahs (abodes) were built by the order of the Mughal Emperor Akbar, and named after the heads of various Pashtun families. Some of these forts have been severely damaged over time.

Under Mughal rule, the city flourished and was notable for commerce and trade. It became the home of the legendary Sufi saint and celebrated poet, Bulleh Shah, who is buried in a large shrine in the city. After the decline of the Mughal Empire, the Kasur region fell into a power vacuum. Kasur was captured by Ahmad Shah Durrani of the Durrani Empire.

Sikh
The Sikhs sacked the city in 1747 under Jassa Singh Ahluwalia, and again in 1763 after Durrani shifted to Afghanistan. The Sikh Empire under Ranjit Singh, captured the city in 1807 in the Battle of Kasur.  During the First Anglo-Sikh War, the city was occupied by Company forces on February 10, 1846.

British
During the British Raj, the irrigation canals were built that irrigated large areas of the Kasur District. Communal disturbances between Sikhs, Hindus, and Muslims erupted in 1908 over the issue of meat sales. Riots erupted following the Jallianwala Bagh massacre on 13 April 1919, leading to the destruction of civic infrastructure, including the city's railway station. Martial law was imposed on 16 April 1919 in response to the riots.

Modern

After the formation of Pakistan in 1947, the minority Hindus and Sikhs migrated to India, while Muslim refugees migrated from India and settled in Kasur. Kasur emerged as a major centre of leather tanning after independence, and is home to 1/3rd of Pakistan's tanning industry.

Kasur is one of the biggest market and trading hub in the country of hides collection and leather tanning and processing. In recent times, hide traders in Kasur were engaged in smuggling donkey hides, a medicinal demand, to China via Karachi Port.

In January 2018, two protestors were killed in rioting over the rape and murder of Zainab Ansari, a seven-year-old girl. There had been 12 similar murders in the past two years, five of which have been linked to one suspect, leading to widespread anger at police failures.

In November 2020, Russia sponsored a 1,122-km high pressure RLNG pipeline from Port Qasim, Karachi to Kasur. In May 2021, Islamabad and Moscow agreed to change the name of the North-South Gas Pipeline Project to "Pakistan Stream Gas Pipeline".

Geography
Kasur is bordered to the north by Lahore, by India to the south and east, it also has borders with Okara and Nankana Sahab district, the city is adjacent to the border of Ganda Singh Wala, a border with its own flag-lowering ceremony.

Ecoregion 
Kasur is situated in a subtropical thorn woodland biome (Northwestern thorn scrub forests) and in the Deserts and xeric shrublands ecoregion according to the World Wide Fund for Nature's map of ecological regions in the world.

Climate 
Kasur has a hot semi-arid climate (Köppen climate classification BSh). Kasur has extremes of climate; the summer season begins from April and continues till September. June is the hottest month. The winter seasons lasts from November to February. January is the coldest month. Rainfall towards the end of June monsoon conditions appear and during the following two and a half months the rainy season alternates with sultry weather. Water logging and salinity has effected a large area of the district making the underground water brackish.

Demography 

The population of Kasur is 382,000 as of 2020. The principal tribes residing here include the Rajput, Jats, Arains, Dogars, Ansari, Sheikh, Pashtuns etc. Among them there are also a concentration of Kashmiris who had migrated earlier, during partition. There are also Moeens or artisans; they include Christians, blacksmiths (Lohar), carpenters (Tarkhan), ceramicists (Kumhar), barbers, weavers etc.

Religion 
The population in Kasur is predominantly Muslim with some small Christian and Hindu minorities. In a census conducted by the Office of the Census Commissioner in 1951, the result was that 96% of the population of Kasur was Muslim with 0.004 being Hindu minorities and 0.034 being Christian minorities.

Notable people 

 Aseff Ahmad Ali, former Foreign Minister
 Naveed Anwar, 21st Leader of Saskatchewan Liberal Party 
 Bawa Lal Dayal, 14th-century saint
 Irshad Ahmed Haqqani, journalist, writer
 Noor Jehan, singer and actress
 Rana Muhammad Iqbal Khan former speaker Punjab assembly
 Ahmad Raza Khan Kasuri, former member of National Assembly of Pakistan
 Fauzia Kasuri, a Pakistani politician and women's activist
 Khurshid Mahmud Kasuri, former Foreign Minister
 Mahmud Ali Kasuri, a Pakistani politician, lawyer and human rights activist
 Nawab Muhammad Ahmed Khan Kasuri, Pakistani judge, allegedly assassinated by Zulfiqar Ali Bhutto
 Bade Ghulam Ali Khan, classical vocalist of British India
 Barkat Ali Khan, classical vocalist of British India
 Yousuf Khan (actor), actor
 Hafiz Ghulam Murtaza, spiritual murshid of Bulleh Shah and Waris Shah
 Sardar Asif Nakai, Member of the Punjab Provincial Assembly
 Sardar Talib Hassan Nakai, Member of National Assembly of Pakistan 
 Najam Sethi, journalist, writer, Pakistan Cricket Board chairman
 Bulleh Shah, Sufi saint and spiritual poet
 Pran Kumar Sharma, Indian cartoonist
 Basit Jehangir Sheikh, Politician, youngest founder member of the Pakistan Peoples Party (P.P.P) 
 Fateh Muhammad Sial, first Ahmadi missionary sent from India

References

External links

 Hasan Saeed  Kasur Safe City Project 
 Minister inspects progress on Kasur Safe City Project  July 27, 2019
 Kasur Safe City Project: PSCA connects CCTV cameras with IC3 Lahore June 26, 2019                CM inaugurates three mega projects in Kasur  July 26, 2019
 Failsal Saeed  Punjab govt all set to launch safe city project in yet another district April 16, 2019

Populated places in Kasur District
Kasur District
Places in the Ramayana
Populated places in Punjab, Pakistan
Cities in Punjab (Pakistan)